Sycamore Bank, based in Senatobia, Mississippi, is a regional bank with assets exceeding $170 million and locations across North Mississippi.

Branches in Senatobia, Southaven, Coldwater, Hernando, and Independence serve customers in these communities as well as residents of the broader Memphis, Tennessee area.

History 
In 1900 a group of 35 local businessmen and farmers established Senatobia Bank. 

As the bank grew beyond Senatobia, it was renamed Sycamore Bank as a reference to its Senatobia roots (the town's name is derived from the Native American Senatohoba, which means White Sycamore, a symbol of rest for the weary).

External links 
Sycamore National Bank, Official site
Sycamore Mortgage Company, Sycamore Mortgage Company

References 

Banks based in Mississippi
Banks established in 1900